Vera Tax is a Dutch politician who has been serving as a Member of the European Parliament for the Labour Party since 2019.

Political career
Tax has been a Member of the European Parliament since the 2019 European elections. In parliament, she has since been serving on the Committee on Transport and Tourism. Since 2021, she has been part of the Parliament's delegation to the Conference on the Future of Europe. 

In addition to her committee assignments, Tax is part of the Parliament's delegation for relations with South Africa. She is also a member of the URBAN Intergroup and of the European Parliament Intergroup on LGBT Rights.

References

External links

1972 births
Living people
Labour Party (Netherlands) MEPs
MEPs for the Netherlands 2019–2024
21st-century women MEPs for the Netherlands